mate poaching may refer to:
 Human mate poaching
 Mate poaching in animals

See also 
 Mate guarding in humans